The nonfiction book The Last Stand of the Tin Can Sailors: The Extraordinary World War II Story of the U.S. Navy's Finest Hour is the first full narrative account of the Battle off Samar, which the book's author, James D. Hornfischer, calls the greatest upset in the history of naval warfare. Published by Bantam Books in February 2004, the book won the Samuel Eliot Morison Award for Naval Literature in 2004 from the Naval Order of the United States.

Content 

A Main Selection of the Book-of-the-Month Club and the Military Book Club, the book tells the story of the remarkable two-and-a-half-hour sea battle fought on October 25, 1944, in which Rear Admiral Clifton A. F. Sprague's task unit, known as "Taffy 3" (7th Fleet's Task Unit 77.4.3), of "jeep carriers" and their "tin can" escorts rose to the impossible challenge of beating back an overwhelming force of Japanese battleships and cruisers under Vice Adm. Takeo Kurita. Survivors of the four U.S. ships lost in the battle—, and —then struggled to survive a two-day-ordeal adrift at sea awaiting rescue. A fifth ship from Taffy 3, the escort carrier , was sunk in a kamikaze attack immediately following the Japanese withdrawal.

Two TV documentaries based on Hornfischer's book have been produced. The first of them, produced by Lou Reda Productions and premiering on The History Channel on November 11, 2005, featured interviews with Hornfischer and veterans of the battle. It was followed by an episode of Dogfights on the History Channel, titled "The Death of the Japanese Navy", premiering on December 29, 2006, which featured a sophisticated CGI rendition of the sea battle.

Episode 9 of Battle 360 dealt with the Battle of Leyte Gulf. However, given that Battle 360 was focused on the carrier , the only survivors who recounted the battle were Enterprise sailors and airmen. In this episode, there were no survivors of Taffy 3 interviewed. In fact there is no mention of any of the Taffy 3 ships or their captains except Commander Ernest E. Evans of the destroyer . The episode skirts the fundamental issue of how close the Japanese came to annihilating Taffy 3.

Graphic Novel
In 2021 Doug Murray and Steve Sanders, with Hornfischer adapted the book into a graphic novel of the same name.

See also 
 Lt. Commander Robert W. Copeland, commanding officer of Samuel B. Roberts

Notes

External links
 www.jameshornfischer.com—James D. Hornfischer's official site
 Interview with James D. Hornfischer at the Pritzker Military Museum & Library
 Battle 360 - BATTLE OF LEYTE GULF History Channel

Samar
Samar
Samar
Books of naval history
2004 non-fiction books
Non-fiction books about the United States Navy